A. E. Smith may refer to:

 A. E. Smith (violin maker) (1880–1978), English-born Australian violin and viola maker
 AE Smith, a privately owned commercial air-conditioning and mechanical services contractor in Australia
 Alan Smith (rugby union) (born 1942), New Zealand All Blacks player
 Allan Edward Smith (1892–1987), American naval officer
 Albert Edward Smith (1871–1947), Canadian religious leader and politician
 Amy Erica Smith (born 1976), American political scientist